Patrick Andrews (1913-1981) was an Irish footballer who played as a midfielder in the League of Ireland.

Andrews was a part of the Bohemians amateur team of the late 1920s and early 1930s. He won full international caps for Irish Free State, making his debut against the Netherlands alongside fellow Bohemian players Fred Horlacher, Bill McGuire and Plev Ellis.

Early years
Andrews was educated at Synge Street CBS where he played Gaelic games and was a tremendous athlete, winning five All-Ireland schools championship titles in athletics. He made the Dublin junior Gaelic football team in the late 1920s but had to give up the sport because of the ban on "foreign games". He so began a career in football by signing for Drumcondra.

Andrews spent two years at Drums before signing for UCD where he also studied. During his time at the college, he showed his all-round sporting ability by winning titles in discus and shot put and playing both cricket and tennis.

Bohemians
Andrews signed for Bohs after UCD where he went on to win the League of Ireland and the FAI Cup, as well as the  League of Ireland Shield. in 1936, he became the 40th man to be appointed Bohemian F.C. captain. He remained close to the club throughout his life as a full member of the club.

Andrews died in 1981.

Honours
Bohemians
 League of Ireland: 1933–34, 1935–36
 FAI Cup: 1935
 League of Ireland Shield: 1934

References

1913 births
1981 deaths
Association footballers from Dublin (city)
Association football midfielders
Irish Free State association footballers
Irish Free State international footballers
Republic of Ireland association footballers
League of Ireland players
Bohemian F.C. players
University College Dublin A.F.C. players
Drumcondra F.C. players
Dublin Gaelic footballers
Gaelic footballers who switched code
People educated at Synge Street CBS